Felix Karasev or Feliks Dmitriyevich Sutyrin (1 May 1929, Leningrad – 12 January 2023, St. Petersburg) was a KGB General and Soviet diplomat. He served three times in Finland between 1963 and 1992. His memoir Naapurinpojan muistelmat was published in Finnish language in 1998.

Both Vladimir Putin and Sergei Ivanov worked for Karasev when he was in the Leningrad and Leningrad Region Directorate of the KGB.

References

1929 births
2023 deaths
Soviet diplomats
KGB officers